Nationality words link to articles with information on the nation's poetry or literature (for instance, Irish or France).

Events
 May–June – English Cavalier poet Richard Lovelace is incarcerated in the Gatehouse Prison, Westminster for defying Parliament, during which time he perhaps writes To Althea, from Prison

Works published
 John Denham, Cooper's Hill, the first example in English of a poem devoted to local description, in this case the Thames scenery around the author's home at Egham in Surrey; the poem was rewritten many times and later received high praise from Samuel Johnson, although Denham's reputation later ebbed
 Arthur Johnston, died 1641, Opera, Scottish poet writing in Latin
 Sir Francis Kynaston, Leoline and Sydanis
 Henry More, Psychodia Platonica; or, A Platonicall Song of the Soul
 Alexander Ross, Mel Heliconium; or, Poeticall Honey
 John Taylor, Mad Fashions, Odd Fashions, All Out of Fashions; or, The Emblems of those Distracted Times

Births
Death years link to the corresponding "[year] in poetry" article:
 Abdul-Qādir Bēdil (died 1720), Persian poet and Sufi
 Vincenzo da Filicaja (died 1707), Italian poet
 Ihara Saikaku (died 1693), Japanese poet and creator of the "floating world" genre of Japanese prose, ukiyo-zōshi
 Thomas Shadwell (died 1692), English poet and playwright who was appointed poet laureate in 1689
 Edward Taylor (died 1729), Colonial American poet, physician, and clergyman

Deaths
Birth years link to the corresponding "[year] in poetry" article:
 June 1 – Sir John Suckling (born 1609), English
 John Chalkhill (born 1594), English
 Francis Kynaston (born 1587), English courtier, poet and translator
 James Mabbe (born 1572), English scholar, poet and translator

See also

 Poetry
 17th century in poetry
 17th century in literature
 Cavalier poets in England, who supported the monarch against the puritans in the English Civil War

Notes

17th-century poetry
Poetry